The 1968 New Zealand tour rugby to Australia and Fiji was the 21st tour by the New Zealand national rugby union team to Australia and it ended with a match at Fiji.

The previous tour by the All Blacks to Australia was the 1962 tour. The Wallabies had  visited New Zealand in 1964.

The All Backs won all both Test matches and the Bledisloe Cup.

Before the first Test Australian coach (and former Wallaby and All Black) Des Connor had studied the rulebook and after consulting with referees, he introduced tactically the first short lineout ever used in a match in the southern hemisphere. This tactic is now a common part of rugby at all levels.

The tour 
Scores and results list All Blacks's points tally first.

References

External links 
 New Zealand in Australia and Fiji 1968 from rugbymuseum.co.nz

Published sources
 Howell, Max (2005) Born to Lead – Wallaby Test Captains, Celebrity Books, Auckland NZ

New Zealand
New Zealand tour
tour
New Zealand tour
New Zealand national rugby union team tours of Australia
Rugby union tours of Fiji
New Zealand national rugby union team tours